Twelve ships of the Royal Navy have been named Adventure. A thirteenth was planned but never completed:

  was a 26-gun galley launched in 1594 and broken up 1645.
  was a 32-gun ship launched in 1646, rebuilt in 1691 and captured by the French in 1709.
  was a 40-gun fifth rate launched in 1709 and broken up in 1741.
  was a fourth-rate ship of the line launched in 1741, rebuilt as a 32-gun fifth rate in 1758, and sold in 1770.
  was a 12-gun cutter purchased in 1763 and sold in 1768.
  was a survey ship, originally a collier named Marquis of Rockingham. She was purchased in 1771 and renamed Rayleigh, then renamed Adventure later that year. She accompanied  on James Cook's second voyage to the Pacific (1772–1775). She returned to mercantile service after Cook's expedition; she was sunk in the Saint Lawrence River in 1811.
  was a 44-gun fifth rate launched in 1784 and broken up in 1816.
She was converted to a survey ship in 1817 and renamed HMS Adventure in 1821. She was sold in 1853.
She was renamed HMS Adventure in 1857 and was broken up in 1877.
 HMS Adventure was to have been a torpedo ram. She was ordered in 1885 but was cancelled before her launch.
  was a river gunboat launched in 1891, transferred to British Central Africa in 1896 and sold in 1921.
  was an  scout cruiser launched in 1904 and sold in 1920.
  was a minelayer launched in 1924.  She was used as a repair ship from 1944 and was sold in 1947.

See also

References
 

Royal Navy ship names